The 2010 Basildon District Council election took place on 6 May 2010 to elect members of Basildon District Council in Essex, England. One third of the council was up for election and the Conservative party stayed in overall control of the council.

After the election, the composition of the council was
Conservative 29
Labour 10
Liberal Democrats 3

Election result
The results saw the Conservatives retain control of the council after winning half of the votes cast. This enabled them to win 11 seats, compared to 2 for Labour and 1 for the Liberal Democrats. With the election having taken place at the same time as the general election, turnout was 64%, a rise from the 29% recorded at the 2008 election.

All comparisons in vote share are to the corresponding 2006 election.

Ward results

Billericay East

Billericay West

Burstead

Crouch

Fryerns

Laindon Park

Langdon Hills

Lee Chapel North

Nethermayne

Pitsea North West

Pitsea South East

Wickford Castledon

Wickford North

Wickford Park

References

2010
2010 English local elections
May 2010 events in the United Kingdom
2010s in Essex